Judith Wessendorf (born 20 November 1992 in Berlin), better known under the stage name Juju, is a German rapper.

Life and career
Born as the daughter of a German mother and Moroccan father, Juju grew up in a poor area in the Berlin district Neukölln. As a child, she listened to German gangsta rap (Bushido, Aggro Berlin, Sido, etc.) and since she was 14, Juju started rapping as a hobby in her free time. In 2010, she met Nura for the first time. Later they formed the German rap crew SXTN. Their first song was Deine Mutter and their most successful Von Party zu Party (which reached 30 million views on Youtube two years later) and Bongzimmer. In 2018, Nura and Juju separated and began their solo careers. Juju reached the top of the German single charts with the singles "Melodien" (with Capital Bra), "Vermissen" (with Henning May) and "Kein Wort" (with Loredana).

Discography

Albums

Singles

As featured artist

Other charted songs

SXTN

Awards and nominations

Results

Tours

Headlining 
 2019: Bling Bling Tour
 2020-2022: Juju Live (cancelled due to COVID-19 pandemic)
 2022: Fick Dein Insta Tour

References

External links

German rappers
1992 births
Living people
Musicians from Berlin
German people of Moroccan descent
German women musicians
German women rappers
German people of Berber descent
MTV Europe Music Award winners
People from Neukölln